The Marine and Fisheries Division is a department of the Welsh Government whose purpose is to protect and regulate the fishing industry in the seas around Wales.

Its equivalent organisations elsewhere in the United Kingdom are the Marine Management Organisation in England, and Marine Scotland.

Fleet 

The division maintains a multi-million pound fleet consisting of five Fisheries Patrol Vessels (FPVs)—high speed boats used for law enforcement and protecting the fishing industry from illegal activity. They were built in Pembrokeshire by Mainstay Marine Solutions, and named after prominent Welsh people.

Pride of Wales 

Upon being retired by the Welsh Government in 2019, FPV Aegis was renamed to Pride of Wales and donated to the Liberia as part of the Wales for Africa programme. The vessel was hoped to help protect more than 40,000 Liberian fishermen from foreign trawlers operating illegally in Liberian waters.

Ensign 

An ensign for use aboard ships used by the Welsh Government, such as the patrol boats of the Marine and Fisheries Division, was granted in 2017.

The flag is a British blue ensign defaced with a yellow dragon with red claws and tongue. Such blue ensigns are conventionally used to indicate government-controlled ships, and the dragon is a traditional symbol of Wales.

It was designed in 2017 at the request of the Welsh Government by Red Dragon Flagmakers in conjunction with Thomas Woodcock, the Garter Principal King of Arms. On 19 December 2017, the flag's use by the Welsh Government was authorised by the UK Defence Secretary, and was registered with the College of Arms in January 2018.

References

External links
Welsh Government Marine and Fisheries
Welsh Government Marine and Fisheries on Twitter

Law enforcement agencies of Wales
Fisheries agencies
Fishing in Wales
Wales